Isolde Mathilde Liebherr (born 10 July 1949, Memmingen, Germany) is a German-Swiss billionaire entrepreneur and vice chairman of Liebherr Group.

Life and education 
Born in Memmingen, Isolde Liebherr grew up in the Upper Swabian village of Kirchdorf and Biberach as the fourth of five children of company founder Hans Liebherr. After graduation high school, she completed a degree in economics and achieved the academic degree Diplom-Kauffrau.

She is the mother of three daughters and lives in Bulle, Switzerland.

Career 
After earning her management degree in 1976, she joined her father's company. In the mid seventies, she took over the services division within the Liebherr Group and was responsible for the hotels and other properties of the company. These include the Interalpen-Hotel Tyrol in Telfs, the Löwen-Hotel Schruns and the hotel The Dunloe in Killarney. In her birthplace Memmingen, the Liebherr Group runs the Hotel Falken. The Bilderberg Conference was held in Telfer Interalpen Hotel in 1988 and 2015.

Since 1994, Isolde Liebherr has been vice president of the administrative board of Liebherr-International AG.

Management 
After the death of her father in 1993 and the renunciation of her brothers Hans, Hubert and Markus, she took over the corporation in the legal form of a stock, together with Willi Liebherr. The only shareholders are family members of the Liebherr family.

Honors and awards 
 Ambassador of the Peace Bell of the Alpine Area 2001
 2012: Honorary Doctorate from the National University of Ireland at Cork

Sponsoring 
Isolde Liebherr is financially involved in horse show jumping. The former Swiss world class rider Markus Fuchs, made his most successful horse Tinka's Boy available to her. Her niece, Christina Liebherr, won the bronze medal at the 2008 Olympic Games with the Swiss show jumper.

References

External links 
 Official website of Liebherr

Swiss industrialists
Swiss businesspeople
People from Bulle
German emigrants to Switzerland
People from Memmingen
1949 births
Living people